Albanian Business Party (in Albanian: Partia e Biznesit Shqiptar) is a political party in Albania. The party was founded in 1996. It is led by Luan Shazivari.

The party is a member of the Democratic Movement for Integration.

References 

Political parties established in 1996
Political parties in Albania
1996 establishments in Albania